The Austrian Gliding Grand Prix 2009 was the last qualifying Gliding Grand Prix for the FAI World Grand Prix 2009.

External links 
 https://web.archive.org/web/20081218231222/http://www.fai.org/gliding/node/418

Gliding competitions
International sports competitions hosted by Austria
2009 in Austrian sport